Robert Marcel Natal (born November 13, 1965) is an American former Major League Baseball catcher. He is an alumnus of the University of California, San Diego.

Career
Drafted by the Montreal Expos in the 13th round of the 1987 MLB amateur draft, Natal made his major league debut with the Montreal Expos on July 18, and appeared in his final game on September 26, .

Natal was a member of the inaugural Florida Marlins team that began play in Major League Baseball in 1993 and won a World Series with the team in 1997.
 
He currently serves as the minor league catching instructor for the New York Mets.

External links

1965 births
Living people
American expatriate baseball players in Canada
Baseball coaches from California
Baseball players from California
Charlotte Knights players
Durham Bulls players
Edmonton Trappers players
Florida Marlins players
Harrisburg Senators players
Indianapolis Indians players
Jamestown Expos players
Major League Baseball bullpen coaches
Major League Baseball catchers
Montreal Expos coaches
Montreal Expos players
Sportspeople from Chula Vista, California
UC San Diego Tritons baseball players
Washington Nationals coaches
Jacksonville Expos players
West Palm Beach Expos players